Valdomiro Vaz Franco, better known as Valdomiro (born 17 February 1946), is a former Brazilian footballer who played as a striker.

He played 17 matches For the Brazilian team between 1973 and 1977, and scored 5 goals. Valdomiro also participated at the 1974 FIFA World Cup, playing in 6 games and scoring one goal.

He scored for Internacional in their 1976 Campeonato Brasileiro Série A final victory over Corinthians, and Valdomiro put in a man of the match performance.

He played for the following clubs:
 Comerciário: 1965–1967
 Perdigão: 1968
 Internacional: 1968–1979
 Millionarios: 1980–1981
 Internacional: 1982

References

1946 births
Living people
Brazilian footballers
Brazil international footballers
Association football forwards
Brazilian expatriate footballers
Campeonato Brasileiro Série A players
1974 FIFA World Cup players
Criciúma Esporte Clube players
Sport Club Internacional players
Millonarios F.C. players
Expatriate footballers in Colombia
People from Criciúma
Sportspeople from Santa Catarina (state)